La Maison Tellier is a French rock group with American country and folk influences, founded in 2004 by Raoul and Helmut Tellier. The group have released three studio albums, performing in both French and English.

History
Formed in 2004 by Raoul and Helmut Tellier, the group's name was derived from a Guy de Maupassant story of the same name. Their first release was a cover of Rage Against the Machine's "Killing in the Name" on a compilation album Travaux Publics in 2006. They would later go onto release their first album La Maison Tellier in that year. They toured from late 2006 to early 2007 and released their second album Second Souffle in 2007 on the Euro-Visions label.

Their third album, L'Art de la Fugue, was released in 2010 via the Troisième Bureau label. The album incorporated "American traditions" and reached position 84 of the French album charts.

Discography

References

External links

French musical groups
Musical groups established in 2004